Frank Hamilton may refer to:

Frank Hastings Hamilton (1813–1886), American surgeon
Frank Fletcher Hamilton (1921–2008), Canadian Progressive Conservative MP
Frank Hamilton (musician) (born 1934), American folk musician and co-founder of Chicago's Old Town School of Folk Music
Frank Hamilton (rugby union) (1863–1901), South African rugby union player
Frank Hamilton (singer), English singer, songwriter and producer

See also
Francis Hamilton (disambiguation)